John Scott Jr. (born December 15, 1975) is an American football coach and former player.  He is currently the defensive line coach for the Detroit Lions. Scott played professionally for the Greensboro Prowlers of the AF2 and the Montreal Alouettes of the CFL before entering the collegiate coaching ranks.

Playing career

High school
Scott played for Greer High School in Greer, South Carolina. He graduated in 1995 after playing on the 1994 state championship team.

College
Scott lettered at Western Carolina at the defensive end position for four years from 1995 to 1998. In 1997, Scott led all defensive linemen in tackles, and was a second team All-Southern Conference selection. Scott graduated with a Bachelor's degree in communications in 2000.

Professional
Following his graduation from Western Carolina, Scott played three years of professional football. From 2000 to 2001, Scott played for the Greensboro Prowlers of the Af2 league and was named the team's defensive player of the year in 2000. In 2003, Scott participated in preseason camp for the Canadian Football League's Montreal Alouettes.

Coaching career
Scott entered the coaching ranks in 2001 as a defensive line coach at West Davidson High School in Tyro, North Carolina. Following that, Scott accepted a graduate assistant position at Louisiana–Lafayette while earning a master's degree from 2002 to 2004. Subsequently, Scott spent one year as the defensive line coach for Norfolk State before returning to his alma mater Western Carolina to coach defensive ends and outside linebackers. He spent three seasons at Western Carolina before spending the 2009 season as the defensive ends coach for Missouri State.

After his stint at Missouri State, Scott accepted a position as the special teams and defensive line coach for Georgia Southern for three seasons.  During his time with the Eagles, Scott mentored Brent Russell, who was an All-American all three seasons under him and finished as the program's all-time sack leader.  Scott also influenced All-American Roderick Tinsley an All-Southern Conference selection John Douglas during his three seasons in Statesboro.

In January 2013, Scott was hired as the defensive line coach for Texas Tech under head coach Kliff Kingsbury. During his two seasons with the Red Raiders, Scott mentored All-Big 12, Kerry Hyder and Branden Jackson.

New York Jets
Scott was hired by the New York Jets, under head coach Todd Bowles, as a defensive quality control coach on February 11, 2015. He was promoted to assistant defensive line coach on February 9, 2016.

Arkansas Razorbacks
Scott was hired by the Arkansas Razorbacks and head coach Bret Bielema as the new defensive line coach on February 7, 2017, replacing Rory Segrest.  He remained on staff in 2018.

South Carolina Gamecocks
On January 22, 2019, it was announced by head coach Will Muschamp that Scott was hired as the new defensive line coach at the University of South Carolina.  Under Scott Jr.'s guidance, Javon Kinlaw was named first-team All-SEC by the coaches.

Penn State Nittany Lions
On February 8, 2020, Scott was announced as the defensive line coach for the Penn State Nittany Lions and head coach James Franklin.

Detroit Lions
The Detroit Lions hired Scott as their defensive line coach on February 27, 2023.

References

External links
Texas Tech Profile
South Carolina Profile

1975 births
Sportspeople from Omaha, Nebraska
African-American coaches of American football
Players of American football from Nebraska
American football defensive ends
Texas Tech Red Raiders football coaches
New York Jets coaches
Living people
Louisiana Ragin' Cajuns football coaches
Norfolk State Spartans football coaches
Western Carolina Catamounts football players
Western Carolina Catamounts football coaches
Georgia Southern Eagles football coaches
Missouri State Bears football coaches
Montreal Alouettes players
Greensboro Prowlers players
African-American players of American football
Penn State Nittany Lions football coaches
21st-century African-American sportspeople
20th-century African-American sportspeople